Polish Peasant Party "Wyzwolenie" or Polish People's Party "Wyzwolenie"<ref>Wyzwolenie is Polish for Liberation, and many sources translate the party's name fully as Polish Peasant Party "Liberation" or Polish People's Party "Liberation"</ref>' (Polish: Polskie Stronnictwo Ludowe "Wyzwolenie", abbreviated as PSL Wyzwolenie) was a political party from the interwar period of the Second Polish Republic (1915–1931).

It was formed in 1915 by several peasant parties in Kingdom of Poland. In comparison to Polish People's Party "Piast", it was a left-wing party, and an ally of Polish Socialist Party (Polska Partia Socjalistyczna). PSL Wyzwolenie supported the May Coup in 1926, but soon afterwards distanced itself from Sanation and joined the opposition. In 1931 it merged with several other parties forming the People's Party (Stronnictwo Ludowe'').

Politicians 
Important politicians included:
 Gabriel Narutowicz
 Stanisław Thugutt
 Tomasz Nocznicki
 Maksymilian Malinowski

Election results

Sejm

Senate

References

1915 establishments in Poland
1931 disestablishments in Europe
Agrarian parties in Poland
Defunct socialist parties in Poland
Wyzwolenie
Political parties disestablished in 1931
Political parties established in 1915
Secularism in Poland